Sunita Shroff is a British television presenter and actress.

Early life
Sunita Shroff was born in Scotland to Irish and Indian parents, and raised in Greece where she was educated in the Campion School. She speaks fluent Greek, Italian and French.

Career
Her TV career started at Channel East where she fronted their flagship current affairs show. Shroff went on to compete against 11,000 other people in the BBC Talent Competition and came in the final 3 in the ‘Holiday Program' category.

Shroff gained presenting experience on the QVC shopping channel and has gone on to work as a presenter on a variety of terrestrial television projects, predominantly relating to the property market. She has also pursued an acting career, appearing in a number of television serials, commercials and in films.

Presenting credits
Secret Location 
House Swap - BBC1
Homes & Property - ITV1
Get a new life - BBC2
Moving Day - ITV1
A house in the country - ITV1
Women in the property market - Sky Digital (UK & Ireland)
Upfront - BBC
QVC - Sky Digital (UK & Ireland)
Channel East - Sky Digital (UK & Ireland)
Cook and Chat - Sky Digital (UK & Ireland)
Lifestyle - Sky Digital (UK & Ireland)
Live Mozambique 8 hour Telethon - Sky Digital (UK & Ireland)
Viewing for leisure – Travel Series in Greece - Sky Digital (UK & Ireland)
Great big british quiz - Sky Digital (UK & Ireland)
BBC talent (Final 3 in ‘Holiday’ program category) - BBC

Acting credits - TV
Coronation Street - Granada Television
The Bill - ITV
Emmerdale - ITV
Gunrush - ITV
Broken News - BBC
Spookes - Lot 49 Films
Strike Back: Project Dawn

Acting credits - film
Fair is Fare
Man Walks Into a Pub
Being Lucky
Privacy
How to Squat, a Guide
Person to Persian
Paid Arrogance
Hallowed Ground
The Odd Conversation

Personal life
Child  = Mimi Hedderly

Charity work
In 2006, she competed in the Macmillan 4x4 UK Challenge charity event raising £2,000 for Macmillan Cancer Support.

References

External links

Living people
British television presenters
British actresses
British people of Irish descent
Indian people of Irish descent
British people of Indian descent
British women television presenters
Year of birth missing (living people)